"Flash" is a song by British rock band Queen. Written by guitarist Brian May, "Flash" is the theme song of the 1980 film Flash Gordon.

There are two versions of the song. The album version ("Flash's Theme") is in fact the start to the film, with all the dialogue from the first scene. The single version contains dialogue cut from various parts of the film, most memorably, Brian Blessed's character exclaiming "Gordon's alive?!" This version was also included on the Greatest Hits compilation from 1981.

Flash is sung as a duet between Freddie Mercury and Brian May, with Roger Taylor adding the high harmonies. May plays all of the instruments except for the rhythm section. He used an Imperial Bösendorfer Grand Piano (with 97 keys instead of 88, having an extra octave on the low range), Oberheim OB-X synth (which he plays in the video) and his homemade Red Special electric guitar.

The song reached number 10 on the UK Singles Chart and number three in Germany. On the U.S. charts, "Flash's Theme aka Flash" reached number 42 on the Billboard Hot 100.  It peaked at number 39 on the Cash Box Top 100.

Record World described the single version as a "supersonic cut with a chorus hook guaranteed to rescue tired holiday ears."

Music video
The video for the song was filmed at Advision Studios, London, in November 1980 and directed by Don Norman and shows the band performing the song to a screen showing clips from the film. An alternative version broadcast during the Concert for Kampuchea in 1981 with different clips included on the Flash Gordon 2011 iTunes edition.

Personnel
Freddie Mercury – lead and backing vocals
Brian May – lead and backing vocals, electric guitar, piano, synthesizer
Roger Taylor – drums, backing vocals, timpani
John Deacon – bass guitar

Charts

Sales and certifications

Vanguard remix

German producers Vanguard released a cover of "Flash", credited to "Queen + Vanguard", on 10 February 2003. The single peaked at number 15 on the UK Singles Chart, number two on the UK Dance Chart, and number 17 in Germany.

Charts

Live recording
Queen on Fire – Live at the Bowl
Queen Rock Montreal

In other media 
The song is played during an ice dancing routine in the 2007 film Blades of Glory.

The song is played in The Flash episode "Into the Void" where Cisco Ramon plays it when Barry Allen / The Flash enters a black hole to save Chester P. Runk, mentioning that he has been saving the song "for the right moment".

In 2022, the song appears in the Toyota Corolla Cross commercial in Australia but it uses "Cross" instead of "Flash".

References

External links
 
 Lyrics at Queen official website  (original version, reprise, single version)

Film theme songs
Queen (band) songs
1980 singles
1981 singles
Flash Gordon
Male vocal duets
Songs written for films
Songs about comics
Songs about fictional male characters
Songs about outer space
Songs written by Brian May
Song recordings produced by Reinhold Mack
EMI Records singles
Elektra Records singles
Hollywood Records singles
Virgin Records singles
1980 songs
Music based on science fiction works
UK Independent Singles Chart number-one singles